Canton South High School is a public high school in Canton Township, Stark County, Ohio, United States. The school, typically enrolling around 800 students in the 9th, 10th, 11th and 12th grades, is the only high school in the Canton Local School District. It is a member school of the former Stark County Board of Education (now known as the Stark County Educational Service Center).

The school's athletic teams are known as the Canton South Wildcats, and are part of the Eastern Buckeye Conference of the Ohio High School Athletic Association.

A new school was planned by early 2017.

Geography and history
It sits just within the unglaciated region of the Allegheny Plateau. The school is located near North Industry, an unincorporated area once known as Slabtown (for the slabs of wood once used as sidewalks in the past, which were available from local lumber mills).

In 2011, the school was featured on an episode of Robert Irvine's hit series Restaurant: Impossible, centering on the Wildcat Cafe (formerly the Heritage Room), operated by the culinary students.

Notable alumni
 Dick Cunningham, former NBA center
 Dirk Hayhurst, former MLB player (San Diego Padres, Toronto Blue Jays)
 Howard Jolliff, former NBA player (Lakers)
 Devon Torrence, former Ohio State University cornerback and current NFL free agent

References

External links
 Canton Local Schools official website
 Stark County Educational Service Center

High schools in Stark County, Ohio
Buildings and structures in Canton, Ohio
Public high schools in Ohio